Cynthia Morrison aka "Cindini" is an escapologist and strongwoman who is based  in Palm Beach, Florida, USA. She has competed in powerlifting, Scottish highland games and track & field events. In addition she has competed in a modern form of medieval jousting. She is also a professional knife thrower.

Sporting titles and awards

Powerlifting
 World Natural Powerlifting Federation (WNPF) 1992 Submaster World Champion; world records in Squat, Bench Press, Deadlift, and Total.
 American Powerlifting Alliance (APA) 1992 Submaster National Champion and 1992 Florida Woman Powerlifter of the Year, Florida state deadlift record.
 Natural Athlete Strength Association (NASA) Bench Press Record, 1990.
 American Drug Free Powerlifting Association (ADFPA) 1989 Miss Georgia Ironman
 United States Powerlifting Federation (USPF) 1988 Region III Champion

Track and Field
 Two-time National champion, #20 weight throw (W35), USA Track & Field (USATF) masters indoor championships, 1997 & 1998.
 American record holder, #20 weight (W35), 1998.
 USATF #1 ranking, #20 weight throw (W35), 1997.
 USATF Masters Three time "All-American" standard of excellence, #20 weight throw (W35), 1996; #35 superweight throw (W35), 1998, #20 weight throw (W45), 2005.

Jousting
 2000 AJA International Women's Jousting Champion.
 1999 AJA International Women's Jousting Champion.

Scottish Highland Games
 Ambassador Award  Oscar Heidenstam Foundation. London: March, 2000.
 First woman to compete in Scotland in the heavy athletics (turning the caber, stone throw, #28 weight throw, hammer throw), 1994.
 Citizen Patriot Award 2000 Presented at American Legion Post 269

References

 Rodgers, Anne, (16 February 2008), "February's Gutsy Gal is in a class all her own", Palm Beach Post.
 Bower-Doucette, Amy, ( 28 May 2008 ), "Jousting Teacher a Throwback to another Era"  Palm Beach Post.

http://www.palmbeachpost.com/wellington/content/neighborhood/npall/epaper/2008/05/28/npp_horse_0528.html

External links
 http://greatcindini.yolasite.com
 http://www.palmbeachweb.com/boldwolf/morrison.htm
 American Jousting Alliance

Escapologists
Living people
Year of birth missing (living people)
Female powerlifters
Strongwomen
Place of birth missing (living people)